Calle means "street" in Spanish and Venetian.

Calle may also refer to:

Places
Calle-Calle River, southern Chile

Film and television
Calle 7, a Chilean TV Show
Calle 54 (2000), a documentary film

Music
Calle 13 (band), a Puerto Rican hip hop band
"Calle Ocho" (2009), a hip hop song by Pitbull

Other uses
Calle (name)

See also

Cable (disambiguation)
Cale (disambiguation)
Call (disambiguation)
Calla (disambiguation)
Caller (disambiguation)
Callie (disambiguation)
Cally (disambiguation)
Calpe (disambiguation)
Celle (disambiguation)